Veendum Chalikkunna Chakram is a 1984 Indian Malayalam-language film directed by P. G. Vishwambharan and produced by M. Mani. The film stars Shankar, Mammootty, Menaka and Aruna. The film has musical score by Shyam.

Cast 
Shankar as Vinayan
Mammootty as Jose
Menaka as Prameela Nair
Aruna as Meera Joseph
Kundara Johny as Raghavan Nair
Poojappura Ravi as Swamy
Santhakumari as Devakiyamma
V. D. Rajappan
Prathapachandran
Jagannatha Varma
Kannur Sreelatha
Noohu

Soundtrack 
The music was composed by Shyam and the lyrics were written by Chunakkara Ramankutty.

References

External links 
 

1984 films
1980s Malayalam-language films
Films based on Malayalam novels
Films directed by P. G. Viswambharan